Abraham I of Jerusalem (Armenian: Աբրահամ Ա.) was the first Armenian Patriarch of Jerusalem serving the Armenian Patriarchate of Jerusalem founded in 638 by the Armenian Apostolic Church in the Holy Land. Abraham I  was patriarch from 638 to 669 A.D.

The Armenian Apostolic Church began appointing its own bishop in Jerusalem, generally known as the Armenian Patriarch of Jerusalem. The office has continued, with some interruptions, to this day.

See also
Christianity in Israel

References

Abraham
Year of birth unknown
Year of death unknown
7th-century Syrian bishops